Christine Lucyga (born 6 April 1944) is a German SPD politician and former member of the East German Volkskammer (March - October 1990) and the Bundestag (1990–2005).

Lucyga was born in Kolberg, Pomerania (today Kołobrzeg, Poland) and grew up in Rostock, East Germany after her hometown became part of Poland after World War II.

She studied Slavonic and Spanish studies at the University of Rostock and made her doctorate on literature of Latin America in 1980. Between 1969 and 1989 she worked as a teacher of foreign languages at the nautical school at Warnemünde and the Rostock University.

In September 1989 Lucyga joined the opposition party Neues Forum and in late 1989 the Social Democratic Party of Germany. She was elected as the Volkskammer delegate of Rostock in the first free election in East Germany in March 1990 and became a member of the German Bundestag after the reunification of Germany in October 1990. Lucyga was reelected in 1994, 1998, 2002 and abandoned to candidate in 2005.

Sources 
 biography on Bundestag.de

1944 births
Living people
People from Kołobrzeg
Members of the Bundestag for Mecklenburg-Western Pomerania
Members of the Bundestag 2002–2005
Members of the Bundestag 1998–2002
Members of the Bundestag 1994–1998
Members of the Bundestag 1990–1994
Members of the Bundestag 1987–1990
Female members of the Bundestag
University of Rostock alumni
Members of the Volkskammer
Female members of the Volkskammer
20th-century German women politicians
Members of the Bundestag for the Social Democratic Party of Germany
21st-century German women politicians